The 1920–21 WPI Engineers men's basketball team represented Worcester Polytechnic Institute during the 1920–21 NCAA men's basketball season. They were coached by Henry C.  Swasey. The Engineers played their home games at Alumni Gym in Worcester, Massachusetts. The team won its second consecutive New England Championship and finished the season with 15 wins and 3 losses.

References

WPI Engineers men's basketball seasons